White River Valley Junior-Senior High School is a high school located in Switz City, Indiana.

Notable students
Matthew Graves, college basketball coach.

See also
 List of high schools in Indiana

References

External links
Official Website

Public high schools in Indiana
Schools in Greene County, Indiana